The Wave is a 2015 Norwegian disaster film directed by Roar Uthaug. It was Norway's official submission for the Academy Award for Best Foreign Language Film at the 88th Academy Awards but failed to be nominated. A sequel titled The Quake, directed by John Andreas Andersen, was released on 31 August 2018. The third installment The Burning Sea was released 25 February 2022.

Plot

Geologist Kristian Eikjord is working his final day in the Norwegian tourist destination Geiranger before moving to Stavanger with his family, when sensors on the mountain indicate groundwater has disappeared. Later, waiting for the ferry with his children while his wife Idun works a few more days at the hotel, Kristian has an epiphany and rushes back to the geology center, leaving his children Sondre and Julia in the car. He and Jacob find the sensor wires have snapped due to the movements inside the mountain. Kristian's former boss Arvid agrees to enter a higher state of alert, but not to sound the evacuation alarm due to being mid tourist season.

Kristian finds the children have gone to the hotel. Julia wants to say goodbye to their house so Kristian drives with her to stay there one last night. Sondre heads down to the basement of the hotel with headphones to skateboard.

Arvid and Jacob check instrument readings and find them accurate, not a malfunction. Kristian reviews old documents suggesting the readings of contractions in the mountain do indicate the upcoming avalanche. He calls the station and orders the immediate evacuation of Arvid and Jacob from the crevice, and to sound the tsunami alarms for the residents of Geiranger. Moments later the avalanche happens. Arvid sacrifices himself when Jacob's foot becomes trapped, linking Jacob to their zip-line and falling to his death shortly after.

With ten minutes until the tsunami hits Geiranger, Idun and her colleague Vibeke evacuate the hotel guests onto a bus but Sondre is nowhere to be found. Idun refuses to leave him. Danish tourists Maria and Philip Poulsen help her search. Kristian and Julia, stuck in traffic, realize their altitude is dangerously low. They abandon their car to run uphill on foot, shouting for others to do the same. Their neighbor Anna has her leg trapped by a car. Kristian sends Julia up the mountain with Anna's husband Thomas and daughter Teresa, and seats himself and Anna in a van. The tsunami engulfs the vehicle. Idun finds Sondre but too late to escape the tsunami which hits as they rush back downstairs to the basement's bomb shelter. Maria is washed away and Idun and Sondre forcefully close the shelter door.

Kristian survives but finds Anna next to him dead, impaled by debris. Finding Julia alive, he leaves her with Thomas and Teresa while he heads back to Geiranger to find his wife and son. The town is devastated, and the destroyed evacuation bus full of dead passengers including Vibeke but not Idun and Sondre. Down in the bomb shelter, the water level rises, deforming the door which is blocked by heavy debris. Philip, panicking to breathe, pushes Sondre underwater. Idun drowns him to save Sondre.

Kristian finds his son's backpack and furiously bangs on some pipes. Idun and Sondre respond in kind. As Kristian finds them and dives, further water floods the refuge. Removing the debris he reunites with Idun but runs out of air as he returns with Sondre. Idun heads back in a desperate attempt to revive him, but then accepts he has drowned. Sondre gives one last effort which pays off. The family is reunited at Ørnesvingen, and the film closes saying the events are likely to occur in the future, but the date is unpredictable.

Cast
 Kristoffer Joner as Kristian Eikjord, a 40-year-old experienced geologist
 Ane Dahl Torp as Idun Karlsen, Kristian's wife
 Jonas Hoff Oftebro as Sondre, Kristian's son
 Edith Haagenrud-Sande as Julia, Kristian's daughter
 Thomas Bo Larsen as Phillip Poulsen, a Danish tourist
 Mette Horn as Maria Poulsen, Phillip's wife
 Fridtjov Såheim as Arvid Øvrebø, Kristian's former boss
 Herman Bernhoft as Georg
 Arthur Berning as Jacob Vikra
 Silje Breivik as Anna, one of Eikjord's neighbours
 Laila Goody as Margot Valldal, Arvid's assistant
 Eili Harboe as Vibeke, Idun's hotel colleague

Production

Development

Norway is a rockslide prone area (created by the Caledonian orogeny) and The Wave is based on a rock-slide tsunami incident which destroyed the village of Tafjord on 7 April 1934, killing 40 people. Prior to that, a similar incident in 1905 triggered a tsunami killing 60 people, and 31 years later, another 74 lost their lives. Uthaug has always been a fan of Hollywood disaster films such as Twister and Armageddon and had long wanted to make a disaster film in Norway. According to him the challenge was to combine the elements of the American genre film with the reality of the situation in Norway.

All the actors performed their own stunts, something the director said was "utterly nerve-racking." And for a climactic scene, in which Joner tries to rescue his family from a flooded hotel, he trained with free-diving instructors to be able to hold his breath for three minutes underwater.

Release
The Wave had its international premiere at the 2015 Toronto International Film Festival on 16 September 2015.

Box office
The film sold around 800,000 tickets in Norway, and grossed a total of US$8.2 million at the Norwegian box office becoming the highest-grossing film of 2015 in Norway.

Awards and accolades
At the 2016 Amanda Awards, The Wave received the award for Best Norwegian Film in Theatrical Release, as well as the awards for Best Sound Design and Best Visual Effects. In addition, the film was also nominated in the categories of Best Norwegian Film, Best Director, Best Cinematography, and Best Music.

At the Kanon Awards for 2016, The Wave won for Best Male Actor in a Leading Role (Kristoffer Joner), Best Producer, Best Editing, and Best Production Design (Lina Nordqvist).

Critical reception
The film received positive reviews from critics, with praise aimed at the performances of the cast (mostly the two protagonists), cinematography, score and visual effects. Deborah Young of The Hollywood Reporter called the film "an exotic edge-of-seater [that] plays on the beauty and terror of nature" and "a thrilling ride", while chief international film critic Peter Debruge of Variety described it as "an equally impressive tsunami-peril thriller."

The review aggregator website Rotten Tomatoes reported that 83% of critics have given the film a positive review based on 108 reviews, with an average rating of 6.64/10. The site's critics consensus states: "Well-acted and blessed with a refreshingly humanistic focus, The Wave is a disaster film that makes uncommonly smart use of disaster film clichés." Metacritic reports a weighted average score of 68 out of 100 based on 26 critics, indicating "generally favorable reviews".

The special effects were lauded by critics, receiving favorable comparison with those of Hollywood. Deborah Young of The Hollywood Reporter called them "convincingly terrifying and involving." Collider reviewed, "...a major technical achievement that will hopefully make Hollywood reconsider the tendency to go bigger and bigger to the point of excess."

The English-language audio dub, however, was panned by critics. Kelli Marchman of HorrorFuel.com wrote "the voice-over was horrid. The timing was off, and the character's voices were emotionless. It sounded like the lines were being read off of a script by a robot, with no concern of how the characters came across" before recommending the movie only in its original Norwegian.

See also
 List of submissions to the 88th Academy Awards for Best Foreign Language Film
 List of Norwegian submissions for the Academy Award for Best Foreign Language Film

References

External links
 
  (Magnolia Pictures)
 
 
 
 
 The Wave at Cineuropa
 The Wave at Norwegian Film Institute

2015 films
2015 drama films
2010s disaster films
Norwegian disaster films
Norwegian drama films
2010s Norwegian-language films
Norwegian science fiction films
Films about tsunamis
Films directed by Roar Uthaug
Films set in Norway
Films shot in Norway
Flood films